Harmodius of Lepreon was  an ancient Greek writer, whose time is unknown. His work is repeatedly quoted by Athenaeus.

References

Footnotes

Ancient Greek writers